Protein BAT5 is a protein that in humans is encoded by the BAT5 gene.

A cluster of genes, BAT1-BAT5, has been localized in the vicinity of the genes for TNF alpha and TNF beta. These genes are all within the human major histocompatibility complex class III region. The protein encoded by this gene is thought to be involved in some aspects of immunity.

Bat5 structure

Amino acid sequence 

The human BAT5 protein (also known as ABHD16A) is 558 amino acid residues long. It was first identified in 1992 in the gene domains of TNF alpha and TNF beta. The BAT5 (ABHD 16A) proteins found in different species have varying lengths.

BAT5 is highly conserved in human, mice and other mammals. It is found to be expressed in multiple different tissue cells. According to molecular evolutionary genetic analysis, in comparison of 13 mammalian species, it was denoted that the differences in amino acid sequence length are due to splicing in the post transcriptional processing of mRNA.

BAT5 gene location 
Human Bat5 (ABHD16A) is located on chromosome 6. Mice Bat5 (ABHD 16A) is located between TNF and Heat shock protein near the Ck2b protein kinase gene.

BAT5 molecular weight 

BAT5 in humans and mice has been found to be around 63 kDA.

Bat5 implications in recent studies 
In previous studies, the connection of malformations in the BAT5 (ABHD 16A) protein had yet to be linked to noticeable human diseases. Yet recent studies show that the BAT5 (ABHD 16A) has been linked to neurological, immune regulation, Kawasaki's disease and coronary artery disease.

The BAT5 (ABHD 16A) protein has been found to encode a majority of phosphatidylserine (PS) lipase in the brain. PS lipase synthesizes lysophosphatidylserine which is an important signaling lipid that functions in the mammalian central nervous system. According to a cohort study, relating malformations of the BAT5 (ABHD 16A) protein to human disease, the affected individuals presented with intellectual disability and progressive spasticity of the upper and lower limbs.

References

External links

Further reading